Nathriobrium is a monotypic genus of beetle in the family Cerambycidae containing the single species Nathriobrium methioides. It was described by Hovore in 1980.

References 

Cerambycinae
Beetles described in 1980
Monotypic beetle genera